WVHM (90.5 FM) is a Southern Gospel–formatted radio station licensed to Benton, Kentucky, United States, and serving the greater Jackson Purchase area of western Kentucky, including Paducah.  The station is currently owned by Heartland Ministries, Inc. as part of a triopoly with Christian radio station WTRT (88.1 FM) and contemporary Christian station WAAJ (89.7 FM). All three stations share studios on College Street in downtown Hardin, Kentucky, while its transmitter facilities off Dowdy Cemetery Road south of Benton.

In order to broaden its broadcast and listening area, WVHM operates a FM translator on 89.1 FM (W206BB) in Madisonville, Kentucky. That station's transmitter is located on the campus of the North Campus of the Madisonville Community College.

History

WVHM was launched as a local Christian radio outlet for western Kentucky on June 30, 1989. In the 1990s, the station aired programming from the Moody Radio network.

Translators
In addition to the main station, WVHM is relayed by an additional simulcast translator to widen its broadcast area.

References

External links
WVHM's official website

Southern Gospel radio stations in the United States
VHM
1989 establishments in Kentucky
Radio stations established in 1989
Marshall County, Kentucky